Richard Cochran (born June 23, 1938) is a retired American track athlete.

He competed won the bronze medal at the 1960 Summer Olympics in Rome, behind fellow Americans Al Oerter and Rink Babka.

A native of Brookfield, Missouri, Cochran was on the University of Missouri track and field team.  He won two NCAA discus championships in 1959 and 1960. He participated in the 1959 Pan American Games as well. Cochran won Big Eight Conference discus crowns in 1959 and '60, and achieved a track-and-field rarity in 1959, when he was a grand-slam winner in discus, claiming championships in the Texas, Kansas, and Drake Relays. Cochran continues to dominate in discus in the Senior Olympics into his 70s.

References

 

1938 births
Living people
American male discus throwers
Athletes (track and field) at the 1959 Pan American Games
Missouri Tigers men's track and field athletes
Athletes (track and field) at the 1960 Summer Olympics
Olympic bronze medalists for the United States in track and field
People from Brookfield, Missouri
Senior Olympic competitors
Track and field athletes from Missouri
Medalists at the 1960 Summer Olympics
Pan American Games silver medalists for the United States
Pan American Games medalists in athletics (track and field)
Medalists at the 1959 Pan American Games